The men's 60 metres at the 2012 IAAF World Indoor Championships took place March 9 and 10 at the Ataköy Athletics Arena.

Medalists

Records

Qualification standards

Schedule

Results

Heats

Qualification: First 2 of each heat (Q) and 8 fastest qualified (q).  59 athletes from 56 countries participated.  Two athletes did not start the competition.

Semifinals

Qualification: First 2 of each heat (Q) and 2 fastest times (q) qualified.  22 athletes from 21 countries participated.  One athlete did not start the competition.

Final

8 athletes from 7 countries participated.  The final began at 20:05.

References

60 metres
60 metres at the World Athletics Indoor Championships